is a Japanese actress. She debuted at the Takeda Hi-C contest in 1989, which she won. She is represented by the Blooming Agency.

Career
In the 1990s, Makise was called "3M" along with Rie Miyazawa and Alisa Mizuki due to her popularity.

Filmography

Films

 Tokyo Heaven (1990)
 Tugumi (1990)
 Bakumatsu Junjoden (1991), Okita Soji
 Tōki Rakujitsu (1992)
 Yonshimai Monogatari (1995)
 Tora-san's Easy Advice (1995)
 Miyazawa Kenji Sonoai (1996)
 Dream Stadium (1997)
 Takkyu Onsen (1998)
 Face (2000)
 Chinchiromai (2000)
 Turn (2001), Maki Mori
 Our 30-Minute Sessions (2020), Shinobu Murase

TV series

 Hatachi no Yakusoku (1992)
 Saiyuki (1994), Tripitaka
 Shinkonnari (1995)
 Taiyo ga Ippai (1998)
 Hojo Tokimune (2001)
 Manpuku (2018), Shinobu Kawakami
 Ranman (2023), Matsu Nishimura

References

External links
 Agency profile 
 Official blog 

1971 births
Japanese actresses
Japanese idols
Living people
People from Fukuoka